Punk Rock Karaoke is a band originally formed in 1996 in a Los Feliz bar and restaurant in Los Angeles called Vida to serve as entertainment for a New Year's Eve party.
Created as an all star side project by Greg Hetson (Redd Kross, Circle Jerks, Bad Religion),
original members then were Eric Melvin (NOFX), Jennifer Finch (L7), Derek O'Brien (Social Distortion), and Bob Mothersbaugh (Devo). Later members to join the group include Steve Soto (Adolescents, Agent Orange, C.J. Ramone), Stan Lee (The Dickies), Eddie Tatar (The Dickies, D.I.), and following the departure of Derek O'Brien Darrin Pfeiffer (Goldfinger) on drums.

References

Music organizations based in the United States